Nurses Cottage is a heritage-listed cottage at 5 Market Street, Berrima, Wingecarribee Shire, New South Wales, Australia. It is also known as Rose Cottage. It was added to the New South Wales State Heritage Register on 2 April 1999.

History 

It was built as nurses' quarters  1890 for the occupants of the Magistrate's House. It has also been used as a baby health care centre and as a shop for gifts and collectibles.

Description

Nurses Cottage is a small single storey weatherboard cottage with a gabled roof continued as a skillion over the front verandah. The verandah features square timber posts and scalloped boarding to ends (probably later fabric). The main gables have small louvered vents with pointed heads. The windows to front elevation are 2 x 6 pane sashes.

Significance

The former Nurses Cottage is significant to the local community as part of the early housing stock of the town and as a site associated with the Magistrate's House adjacent. Is also a typical representative - in its overall form and what remains of its original detail - of the many small 19th century weatherboard cottages in Berrima. The cottage is also part of the Market Place precinct and Magistrate's House/ White Horse Inn group of buildings.

Heritage listing 
Nurses Cottage was listed on the New South Wales State Heritage Register on 2 April 1999.

See also

References

Bibliography

Attribution 

New South Wales State Heritage Register
Berrima, New South Wales
Houses in New South Wales
Articles incorporating text from the New South Wales State Heritage Register